Angus may refer to:

Media
 Angus (film), a 1995 film
 Angus Og (comics), in the Daily Record

Places

Australia
 Angus, New South Wales

Canada
 Angus, Ontario, a community in Essa, Ontario
 East Angus, Quebec

Scotland
 Angus, Scotland, a traditional county of Scotland and modern council area
 Angus (Scottish Parliament constituency)
 Angus (UK Parliament constituency)

United States
 Angus, Iowa
 Angus, Nebraska
 Angus, Ohio
 Angus, Texas
 Angus, Wisconsin
 Angus Township, Polk County, Minnesota

People

Historical figures
 Óengus I of the Picts (died 761), king of the Picts
 Óengus of Tallaght (died 824), Irish bishop, reformer and writer
 Óengus II of the Picts (died 834), king of the Picts
 Óengus mac Óengusa (died 930), Irish poet
 Óengus of Moray (died 1130), last King of Moray
 Aonghus Mór (died  1293), chief of Clann Domhnaill
 Aonghus Óg of Islay (died 1314×1318/c.1330), chief of Clann Domhnaill
 Aonghas Óg (died 1490), chief of Clann Domhnaill
 Óengus mac Nad Froích (died 489), King of Munster
 The Mormaer of Angus, later the Earl of Angus

Mythology and fiction
 Aengus, figure of Irish mythology
 Óengus Olmucaid, legendary High King of Ireland
 Óengus Ollom, legendary High King of Ireland
 Óengus Tuirmech Temrach, legendary High King of Ireland
 Angus, a character on Oobi
 Angus "Pothole" McDuck, a Disney character who is Scrooge McDuck's uncle
 Angus, a Thane in Shakespeare's Macbeth

Names
 Angus (given name), origin of the name, list of people with the name
 Angus (surname)
 Aengus (given name), origin of the name, list of people with the name
 Aonghas (given name), origin of the name, list of people with the name
 Aonghus (given name), origin of the name, list of people with the name

Other uses 
 Acoustically Navigated Geological Underwater Survey (ANGUS), a deep-towed still camera sled
 Angus Book Award, literary award for UK authors of teenage fiction
 Angus Burger (Burger King), sandwich available at Burger King
 Angus College, college in Arbroath, Scotland
 Angus Folk Museum, a centre for agricultural history and rural life located near Forfar, Angus
 Angus Herald, a current Scottish herald of arms in Extraordinary of the Court of the Lord Lyon
 Angus Automobile Company, a defunct American company; see Fuller

See also 
 Angus cattle (disambiguation)
 
 Óengus mac Fergusa (disambiguation)
 Onuist (disambiguation)
 Agnus (disambiguation)